The  (from Portuguese: Golden Law), adopted on May 13, 1888, was the law that abolished slavery in Brazil. It was signed by Isabel, Princess Imperial of Brazil (1846–1921), an opponent of slavery, who acted as regent to Emperor Pedro II, who was in Europe.

The Lei Áurea was preceded by the Rio Branco Law of September 28, 1871 ("the Law of Free Birth"), which freed all children born to slave parents, and by the Saraiva-Cotegipe Law (also known as "the Law of Sexagenarians"), of September 28, 1885, that freed slaves when they reached the age of 60. Brazil was the last country in the Western world to abolish slavery.

Background 
Aside from the activities of abolitionists, there were a number of reasons for the signing of the law: slavery was no longer profitable, as the wages of European immigrants, whose working conditions were poor, cost less than the upkeep of slaves, and the decline in the arrival of new slaves.

Text 

Analysis 

The succinctness of the law was intended to make clear that there were no conditions of any kind to the freeing of all slaves. However, it did not provide any support to either freed slaves or their former owners to adjust their lives to their new status: slave owners did not receive any state indemnification, and slaves did not receive any kind of compensation from owners or assistance from the state.

Before the abolition of slavery, slaves were prohibited from owning assets or receiving an education; but after being freed, former slaves were left to make their own way in the world. Without education or political representation, former slaves struggled to gain economic and social status in Brazilian society.

The  was authored by Rodrigo A. da Silva, then Minister of Agriculture (in the Cabinet headed by Prime Minister João Alfredo Correia de Oliveira) and member of the Chamber of Deputies, and, after passing both houses of the National Assembly (Assembléia Geral), it was sanctioned by Isabel, Princess Imperial of Brazil (1846–1921), who was Regent at the time, while her father, Emperor Dom Pedro II, was in Europe. 

The Golden Law was signed by the Princess Imperial and countersigned by Rodrigo A. da Silva, in his capacity as Minister of Agriculture. Princess Isabel (who was a staunch supporter of the abolitionist movement) was awarded the "Golden Rose" by Pope Leo XIII and Minister Rodrigo A. da Silva received honors from the Vatican, France and Portugal. In August 1888 Rodrigo A. da Silva went on to be chosen for a lifetime seat in the Senate of the Empire.

See also
Thirteenth Amendment to the United States Constitution
Emancipation Proclamation
Abolitionism in Brazil

References

External links

 Slavery in Brazil, UNESCO Memory of the World programme

Legal history of Brazil
Slavery in Brazil
1888 in law
1888 in Brazil
Abolitionism in Brazil
May 1888 events
1888 in politics
Slavery legislation